Soviet Union–United States summits were held from 1943 to 1991.  The topics discussed at the summits between the president of the United States and either the general secretary or the premier of the Soviet Union ranged from fighting the Axis Powers during World War II to arms control between the two superpowers themselves during the Cold War.

Allies of World War II

Cold War (1953–1962)

Cold War (1962–1979)

Cold War (1985–1991)

See also

 Arms control
 Cold War
 Détente
 Foreign policy of the United States
 Foreign relations of the Soviet Union
 List of international trips made by presidents of the United States
 Nuclear disarmament
 Soviet Union–United States relations
 List of Russia–United States summits

References

External links
Zbigniew Brzezinski interviewed about the summits from the Dean Peter Krogh Foreign Affairs Digital Archives
 
 

20th-century diplomatic conferences
Cold War history of the Soviet Union
Cold War history of the United States
Sum
Diplomacy-related lists
Diplomatic visits by heads of government
Diplomatic visits by heads of state
Lists of United States presidential visits
Soviet Union-related lists
List
United States history-related lists
World War II conferences
Lists of conferences